Ionuț Irimia (born 17 May 1979) is a Romanian former football goalkeeper. He played 115 matches in the Romanian top division.

Club career

CSMS Iași

In March 2012 Irimia joined Liga II team CSMS Iaşi. After half a year in Liga II, Irimia helped his team gain promotion to the Liga I, as they finished the season on 1st place.

References

External links
 

Living people
1979 births
Sportspeople from Bârlad
Romanian footballers
Association football goalkeepers
Liga I players
Liga II players
FC Petrolul Ploiești players
FC Vaslui players
FC CFR Timișoara players
ACF Gloria Bistrița players
FC Politehnica Iași (2010) players
CS Universitatea Craiova players
Moldovan Super Liga players
FC Zimbru Chișinău players
AS Voința Snagov players
Romanian expatriate footballers
Romanian expatriate sportspeople in Moldova
Expatriate footballers in Moldova